Darmstadt is a city in the state of Hesse in Germany, located in the southern part of the Rhine-Main-Area (Frankfurt Metropolitan Region). Darmstadt has around 160,000 inhabitants, making it the fourth largest city in the state of Hesse after Frankfurt am Main, Wiesbaden, and Kassel.

Darmstadt holds the official title "City of Science" as it is a major centre of scientific institutions, universities, and high-technology companies. The European Organisation for the Exploitation of Meteorological Satellites (EUMETSAT) and the European Space Operations Centre (ESOC) are located in Darmstadt, as well as GSI Centre for Heavy Ion Research, where several chemical elements such as bohrium (1981), meitnerium (1982), hassium (1984), darmstadtium (1994), roentgenium (1994), and copernicium (1996) were discovered. The existence of the following elements were also confirmed at GSI Centre for Heavy Ion Research: nihonium (2012), flerovium (2009), moscovium (2012), livermorium (2010), and tennessine (2012). The Facility for Antiproton and Ion Research (FAIR) is an international accelerator facility under construction. Darmstadt is also the seat of the world's oldest pharmaceutical company, Merck, which is the city's largest employer.

The Mathildenhöhe, including the Darmstadt artists' colony, a major centre of the Jugendstil artistic movement, referring both to the group of artists active in the city in the late 19th and early 20th century, as well as the buildings which they designed, together with the Russian Chapel in Darmstadt, was recognized as a World Heritage Site by UNESCO in 2021.

Darmstadt was formerly the capital of a sovereign country, the Grand Duchy of Hesse and its successor, the People's State of Hesse, a federal state of Germany. As the capital of an increasingly prosperous duchy, the city gained some international prominence and remains one of the wealthiest cities in Europe. In the 20th century, industry (especially chemicals), as well as large science and electronics (and later, information technology) sectors became increasingly important, and are still a major part of the city's economy. It is also home to the football club SV Darmstadt 98. Alexandra Feodorovna (Alix of Hesse), the wife of Nicholas II of Russia, as well as Maria Alexandrovna (Marie of Hesse), the wife of Alexander II of Russia, who were related, were born in this city.

History

Origins 
The name Darmstadt first appears towards the end of the 11th century, then as Darmundestat.

Darmstadt was chartered as a city by the Holy Roman Emperor Ludwig the Bavarian in 1330, at which time it belonged to the counts of Katzenelnbogen. The city, then called Darmstait, became a secondary residence for the counts, with a small castle established at the site of the current, much larger edifice.

When the house of Katzenelnbogen became extinct in 1479, the city was passed to the Landgraviate of Hesse, and was seat of the ruling landgraves (1567–1806) and thereafter (to 1918) of the grand dukes of Hesse.

Industrial age 

The city grew in population during the 19th century from little over 10,000 to 72,000 inhabitants. A polytechnical school, which later became a Technical University now known as TU Darmstadt, was established in 1877.

In the beginning of the 20th century, Darmstadt was an important centre for the art movement of Jugendstil, the German variant of Art Nouveau. Also during this period, in 1912 the chemist Anton Kollisch, working for the pharmaceutical company Merck, first synthesised the chemical MDMA (ecstasy) in Darmstadt. Darmstadt's municipal area was extended in 1937 to include the neighbouring localities of Arheilgen and Eberstadt, and in 1938 the city was separated administratively from the surrounding district (Kreis).

Nazi Germany 
Darmstadt was the first city in Germany to force Jewish shops to close in early 1933, shortly after the Nazis took power in Germany. The shops were only closed for one day, for "endangering communal order and tranquility". In 1942, over 3,000 Jews from Darmstadt were first forced into a collection camp located in the Liebigschule, and later deported to concentration camps where most eventually died.

Several prominent members of the German resistance movement against the Nazis were citizens of Darmstadt, including Wilhelm Leuschner and Theodor Haubach, both executed for their opposition to Hitler's regime.

Darmstadt was first bombed on 30 July 1940, and 34 other air raids would follow before the war's end. The old city centre was largely destroyed in a British bombing raid on 11/12 September 1944. This attack was an example of "area bombing" using high explosive and incendiary bombs, which combined in that attack to create a firestorm, a self-sustaining combustion process in which winds generated by the fire ensure it continues to burn until everything possible has been consumed. During this attack an estimated 11,000 to 12,500 of the inhabitants were killed, and 66,000 to 70,000 were left homeless. Over three-quarters of Darmstadt's inner city was destroyed. Post-war rebuilding was done in a relatively plain architectural style, although a number of the historic buildings were rebuilt to their original appearance following the city's capture on 25 March 1945 by the American 4th Armored Division.

Post–World War II 
Throughout the 19th and 20th centuries, Darmstadt became home to many technology companies and research institutes, and has been promoting itself as a "city of science" since 1997. It is well known as a high-tech centre in the vicinity of Frankfurt Airport, with important activities in spacecraft operations (the European Space Operations Centre, European Organisation for the Exploitation of Meteorological Satellites), chemistry, pharmacy, information technology, biotechnology, telecommunications (substantial Deutsche Telekom presence) and mechatronics. In 2000, its region also scored Rank 3 amongst 97 German regions in the WirtschaftsWoche test ranking Germany's high-tech regions.

The roots of Darmstadt University of Applied Sciences goes back to 1876 along with Technische Universität Darmstadt (the first electrical engineering chair and inventions fame), when both these Universities were an integrated entities, a need for a separate industry based research educational institution was felt in the early 1930s, finally University of Applied sciences emerged as a separate industry based research educational institution in 1971 and is the largest University of Applied Sciences in Hesse (German: Hessen) with about 16,500 students.

The TU Darmstadt is one of the important technical institutes in Germany and is well known for its research and teaching in the Electrical, Mechanical and Civil Engineering disciplines. Together with other tertiary institutions, the TU is responsible for the large student population of the city, which stood at 33,547 in 2004.

Boroughs

Darmstadt has nine official 'Stadtteile' (boroughs). These are:

 Darmstadt-Arheilgen
 Darmstadt-Bessungen
 Darmstadt-Eberstadt
 Darmstadt-Kranichstein
 Darmstadt-Mitte ("Central Darmstadt")
 Darmstadt-Nord ("North")
 Darmstadt-Ost ("East")
 Darmstadt-West
 Darmstadt-Wixhausen

Population development

Politics

Mayor 
The current mayor of Darmstadt is Jochen Partsch of Alliance 90/The Greens, who was elected in 2011 and re-elected in 2017.

The most recent mayoral election was held on 19 March 2017, and the results were as follows:

! colspan=2| Candidate
! Party
! Votes
! %
|-
| bgcolor=| 
| align=left| Jochen Partsch
| align=left| Alliance 90/The Greens
| 25,291
| 50.4
|-
| bgcolor=| 
| align=left| Michael Siebel
| align=left| Social Democratic Party
| 8,364
| 16.7
|-
| bgcolor=#448581| 
| align=left| Kerstin Lau
| align=left| UFFBASSE
| 6,235
| 12.4
|-
| bgcolor=| 
| align=left| Christoph Hentzen
| align=left| Free Democratic Party
| 2,801
| 5.6
|-
| bgcolor=| 
| align=left| Uli Franke
| align=left| The Left
| 2,145
| 4.3
|-
| bgcolor=#A037A0| 
| align=left| Helmut Klett
| align=left| UWiGA
| 2,094
| 4.2
|-
| bgcolor=| 
| align=left| Hans Mohrmann
| align=left| Alternative for Germany
| 2,031
| 4.0
|-
| bgcolor=| 
| align=left| Achim Pfeffer
| align=left| Independent
| 973
| 1.9
|-
| bgcolor=| 
| align=left| Thorsten Przygoda
| align=left| Independent
| 293
| 0.6
|-
! colspan=3| Valid votes
! 50,227
! 99.2
|-
! colspan=3| Invalid votes
! 388
! 0.8
|-
! colspan=3| Total
! 50,615
! 100.0
|-
! colspan=3| Electorate/voter turnout
! 115,316
! 43.9
|-
| colspan=5| Source: City of Darmstadt
|}

The following is a list of mayors since 1945:

City council 

The Darmstadt city council (Stadtverordnetenversammlung) governs the city alongside the Mayor. The most recent city council election was held on 14 March 2021, and the results were as follows:

! colspan=2| Party
! Lead candidate
! Votes
! %
! +/-
! Seats
! +/-
|-
| bgcolor=| 
| align=left| Alliance 90/The Greens (Grüne)
| align=left| Hildegard Förster-Heldmann
| 1,151,498
| 27.4
|  2.3
| 20
|  1
|-
| bgcolor=| 
| align=left| Social Democratic Party (SPD)
| align=left| Tim Huß
| 703,686
| 16.7
|  0.5
| 12
| ±0
|-
| bgcolor=| 
| align=left| Christian Democratic Union (CDU)
| align=left| Paul Georg Wandrey
| 654,797
| 15.6
|  2.6
| 11
|  2
|-
| bgcolor=| 
| align=left| The Left (Die Linke)
| align=left| Karl-Heinz Böck
| 310,074
| 7.4
|  0.6
| 5
| ±0
|-
| bgcolor=| 
| align=left| Volt Germany (Volt)
| align=left| Nicolas Kämmerer
| 289,023
| 6.9
| New
| 5
| New
|-
| bgcolor=#448581| 
| align=left| UFFBASSE
| align=left| Kerstin Lau
| 269,301
| 6.4
|  1.3
| 5
| ±0
|-
| bgcolor=| 
| align=left| Free Democratic Party (FDP)
| align=left| Leif Blum
| 234,121
| 5.6
|  0.3
| 4
| ±0
|-
| bgcolor=| 
| align=left| Alternative for Germany (AfD)
| align=left| Günter Zabel
| 191,982
| 4.6
|  4.6
| 3
|  4
|-
| bgcolor=#A037A0| 
| align=left| UWiGA
| align=left| Erich Bauer
| 130,867
| 3.1
|  0.6
| 2
|  1
|-
| bgcolor=| 
| align=left| Die PARTEI (PARTEI)
| align=left| Holger Eisenblätter
| 90,254
| 2.1
|  1.8
| 2
|  2
|-
| bgcolor=#556B2F| 
| align=left| Voters' Association of Darmstadt (WGD)
| align=left| Falk Neumann
| 85,320
| 2.0
| New
| 1
| New
|-
| bgcolor=| 
| align=left| Free Voters (FW)
| align=left| Harald Uhl
| 79,293
| 1.9
| New
| 1
| New
|-
| 
| align=left| Take Part in Darmstadt
| align=left| Dorothea Mondry
| 13,680
| 0.3
| New
| 0
| New
|-
! colspan=3| Valid votes
! 60,815
! 96.6
! 
! 
! 
|-
! colspan=3| Invalid votes
! 2,141
! 3.4
! 
! 
! 
|-
! colspan=3| Total
! 62,956
! 100.0
! 
! 71
! ±0
|-
! colspan=3| Electorate/voter turnout
! 115,119
! 54.7
!  6.9
! 
! 
|-
| colspan=8| Source: Statistics Hesse
|}

Transport 

Darmstadt is highly connected to all means of transportation, including the Autobahn Network, the Intercity-Express Network and a major international airport.

Roads 
Darmstadt is connected to a number of major roads, including two Autobahnen (Bundesautobahn 5 and Bundesautobahn 67). The main road passing west–east is the Bundesstraße 26, the Bundesstraße 3 runs north–south. The rural areas east of the city in the Odenwald are accessed by several secondary roads.

Public transport in Darmstadt 

The extensive public transport system of Darmstadt is integrated in the RMV (the transportation authority of the Frankfurt Metropolitan Area). The backbone of public transport in Darmstadt is its modern tram system with 9 lines and a local bus service serving all parts of the city. Darmstadt is furthermore connected to the Frankfurt S-Bahn system and being served by regional bus lines. Furthermore, regional rail lines (R64, R65, R66) connect six secondary railway stations within the city.

Regional rail links 

Darmstadt is connected to the Frankfurt rapid transit network by S-Bahn line . Besides that, a number of regional trains connect secondary railway stations within Darmstadt and the region with Darmstadt Hauptbahnhof (main station), offering a net of inner city and regional train links.

National rail links 
By its main railway station Darmstadt Hauptbahnhof, which is located in the western part of the central city, Darmstadt is connected to the rest of Germany and Europe by the Intercity-Express network and other long-distance trains. Darmstadt Hauptbahnhof is a busy station with 12 platforms which serves as a transportation hub for the southern Hesse/Odenwald region.

Airports 
The historically important local airfield August Euler Airfield is closed to aviation at large, being reserved for the use of the Technische Universität Darmstadt.

 Frankfurt International Airport

The airport ranks among the world's busiest airports by passenger traffic and is the second-busiest airport by cargo traffic in Europe. The airport also serves as the main hub for German flag carrier Lufthansa.

 Frankfurt Egelsbach Airport
Frankfurt Egelsbach Airport (Flugplatz Frankfurt-Egelsbach) is a busy general aviation airport located 5 km north of Darmstadt, near the town of Egelsbach.

 Frankfurt Hahn Airport
Hahn Airport is a major base for low-cost carrier Ryanair. This airport can only be reached by car or bus.

National coach services 
Darmstadt is served by several national and European bus links which connect Darmstadt with other German and European cities.

Parks, architecture, and attractions

Castles and historical buildings 

Darmstadt was the capital of an independent country (the Grand Duchy of Hesse) until 1871 and the capital of the German state of Hesse until 1945. It is due to its past as a capital city that it has many architectural testimonies of this period. Many of its major architectural landmarks were created by Georg Moller who was appointed the court master builder of the Grand Duchy of Hesse. Due to the fact that the last ruling Grand Duke of Hesse, Ernst Ludwig was a grandson of Queen Victoria and brother to Empress Alexandra of Russia, the architecture of Darmstadt has been influenced by British and Russian imperial architecture with many examples still existing, such as the Luisenplatz with its grand-ducal column, the old Hessian State Theatre (at Karolinenplatz) and the Russian Chapel by Leon Benois. The Russian church, St. Mary Magdalene Chapel, is named in honor of the patron saint of Tsar Nicholas' mother and was built of Russian stone on Russian soil brought to Darmstadt by train. It was used by the Russian imperial family and court during regular visits to the Tsarina's brother and family in Darmstadt. The Residential Palace Darmstadt is located in the city centre. It was the residence of the counts of Hesse-Darmstadt, later as Grand Dukes of Hesse by the grace of Napoleon. The rulers of Hesse also owned Jagdschloss Kranichstein, a hunting lodge in Kranichstein which is a nowadays used as a five star hotel. The most famous castle in the Darmstadt region is Frankenstein Castle due to claims that the real castle may have had an influence on Mary Shelley's decision to choose the name Frankenstein for her monster-creating scientist. This castle dates back to the 13th century, but it was acquired by the counts of Hesse-Darmstadt in 1662.

Modern architecture 

Darmstadt has a rich tradition in modern architecture. After 1945 several "Meisterbauten" (Masterful Architectonic Creations) were built that set standards for modern architecture. These buildings still exist and are used for various public and private purposes. In the late 1990s the Waldspirale ('Forest Spiral') was built, a residential complex by Austrian Friedensreich Hundertwasser. As an almost surreal building, it is internationally famous for its almost absolute rejection of rectangular forms, down to every window having a different shape, the style being a trademark of Hundertwasser's work. Hundertwasser died before the Waldspirale was finished.

Art Nouveau 

Darmstadt was a centre of the Art Nouveau movement. Surviving examples of the Jugendstil period include the Rosenhöhe, a landscaped English-style rose garden from the 19th century, recently renovated and replanted, the UNESCO World Heritage Site Mathildenhöhe, with the Hochzeitsturm ('Wedding tower', also commonly known as the 'Five-Finger-Tower') by Joseph Maria Olbrich, the Russian Chapel in Darmstadt and large exhibition halls as well as many private villas built by Jugendstil architects who had settled in Darmstadt. German Art Nouveau is commonly known by its German name, Jugendstil. The name is taken from the artistic journal, Die Jugend, which was published in Munich and which espoused the new artistic movement. It was founded in 1896 by Georg Hirth (Hirth remained editor until his death in 1916, and the magazine continued to be published until 1940). The magazine was instrumental in promoting the style in Germany. As a result, its name was adopted as the most common German-language term for the style: Jugendstil ("young style"). Although, during the early 20th century, the word was applied to only two-dimensional examples of the graphic arts, especially the forms of organic typography and graphic design found in and influenced by German magazines like Jugend, Pan, and Simplicissimus, it is now applied to more general manifestations of Art Nouveau visual arts in Germany, the Netherlands, the Baltic states, and Nordic countries. The two main centres for Jugendstil art in Germany were Munich and Darmstadt.

Squares 
The Luisenplatz, the central square of the city, forms the centre of the city and is the main public transport hub. In 1844 the Ludwigsäule (called Langer Lui, meaning Long Ludwig), a 33-metre (108 ft) column commemorating Ludwig I, first Grand Duke of Hesse, was placed in the middle of the square. While the column still stands, the square is today surrounded by mostly modern buildings. Other important squares are the Marktplatz (see image) near the old city hall and the Sabaisplatz at the Mathildenhöhe.

Parks 

The city has a high density of parks. Among the most important parks are the English style Herrngarten in central Darmstadt. In former times it was part of the Royal Gardens used exclusively by the dukes of Darmstadt. Today it is a public park, heavily used in every season of the year. Other important parks are the French style parks Prinz-Georgs-Garten and Orangerie, the modern style Bürgerpark ("People's Park") in northern Darmstadt and the mystical Park Rosenhöhe, ("Rose Heights") which also serves as the cemetery for the dukes and their immediate family, with two impressive mausoleum buildings (Altes Mausoleum and Neues Mausoleum) in its remote parts. The Botanischer Garten in eastern Darmstadt is a botanical garden maintained by the Technische Universität Darmstadt with a fine collection of rare plants and trees.

Churches 

The Protestant Stadtkirche Darmstadt built in 1369, is in the pedestrian zone of the downtown city center, next to the historic Hotel Bockshaut. The church has gothic elements along with renaissance and baroque, it houses the royal crypt. Hotel Bockshaut was built in 1580 for a church presbytery. The most important Catholic Church is St. Ludwig in central Darmstadt. The Russian Chapel in Darmstadt is a Russian orthodox church which is still in use. It was built and used as a private chapel by the last Tsar of Russia, Nicholas II, whose wife Alexandra was born in Darmstadt. Although Russian orthodox churches also exist in other cities outside Russia, the Russian Chapel in Darmstadt was the only official Russian church used by the Tsar outside the Russian Empire. It is said that the chapel was built on Russian soil that was brought to Darmstadt exclusively for the purpose of building the Tsar's private chapel on it.

Festivals 
Every year on the first weekend of July the Heinerfest festival is held in the streets surrounding the old ducal palace. It is a traditional German festival with music acts, beer halls, amusement rides and booths selling trinkets and food. The similar , which is more live music-oriented, is held in the same location every year in May. These two festivals attract 700,000 and 400,000 visitors respectively.

Culture 

Darmstadt has a rich cultural heritage. The Staatstheater Darmstadt dates back to the year 1711. The present building has been in use since 1972 and has three halls which can be used independently. The "Grand Hall" (Großes Haus) provides seats for 956 people and serves as Darmstadt's opera house. The "Small Hall" (Kleines Haus) is mostly used for plays and dance and has 482 seats. A separate small hall (Kammerspiele), with 120 seats, is used for chamber plays.

Among the museums in Darmstadt the most important are the Hessisches Landesmuseum (Hessian State Museum), the Porcelain Museum (exhibition of the ducal porcelain), the Schlossmuseum (exhibition of the ducal residence and possessions), the Kunsthalle Darmstadt (exhibitions of modern art), the exhibition centre Mathildenhöhe, and the Museum Künstlerkolonie (Art Nouveau museum).

The Jazz-Institut Darmstadt is Germany's largest publicly accessible jazz archive.

The Internationales Musikinstitut Darmstadt, harboring one of the world's largest collections of post-war sheet music, also hosts the biennial Internationale Ferienkurse für Neue Musik, a summer school in contemporary classical music founded by Wolfgang Steinecke. A large number of avant-garde composers have attended and given lectures there, including Olivier Messiaen, Luciano Berio, Milton Babbitt, Pierre Boulez, Luigi Nono, John Cage, György Ligeti, Iannis Xenakis, Karlheinz Stockhausen, Mauricio Kagel, and Helmut Lachenmann.

The Deutsche Akademie für Sprache und Dichtung provides writers and scholars with a place to research the German language. The academy's annual Georg Büchner Prize, named in memory of Georg Büchner, is considered the most prestigious literary award for writers of German language.

Geography

Darmstadt is located in the Upper Rhine Plain (German: Oberrheinische Tiefebene), a major rift, about 350 km (217 mi) long and on average 50 km (31 mi) wide, between the cities of Frankfurt in the north and Basel in the south. Darmstadt's southeastern boroughs are located in the spurs of the Odenwald, a low mountain range in Southern Hesse between the Main and Neckar rivers.

Climate
Southern Hesse is well known for its mild climate which allows winegrowing on a large scale in the region south of Darmstadt. The weather is often volatile with the summers being warm and humid with frequent thunderstorms, the winters mostly relatively mild with frequent periods of high fog. Snowfall is most likely in January and February, but mild winters without considerable snowfall can occur.

Education

Schools 
The City of Darmstadt offers students a broad variety of public primary, secondary and tertiary schools. Besides them private schools exist, e.g. the catholic secondary school Edith-Stein-Schule, the Adventists' Schulzentrum Marienhöhe, an anthroposophic Waldorf School, a Comenius School and other faith based private schools.

Universities

TU Darmstadt

The Technical University of Darmstadt (German: Technische Universität Darmstadt), commonly referred to as TU Darmstadt, is a prestigious research university in Germany. It was founded in 1877 and received the right to award doctorates in 1899. In 1882 it was the first university in the world to set up a chair in electrical engineering, in 1883 the first faculty for electrical engineering was founded there. The university is organized in 13 departments and 5 fields of study, which all together offer about 100 courses of studies. The fields of study offer interdisciplinary degree courses in which students take lectures in multiple departments. The university, as its title suggests, offers degree courses in the fields of electrical, mechanical and civil engineering, architecture, computer science, mathematics and the natural sciences. It also offers courses in economics, law, history, politics, sociology, psychology, sport science and linguistics. It also offers degree courses for teaching positions at German vocational schools and Gymnasiums.

Hochschule Darmstadt

The Darmstadt University of Applied Sciences (German: Hochschule Darmstadt) has the highest number of industrial linkage programs, compared to the rest of the universities of applied sciences. The roots of University of Applied Sciences Darmstadt dates back to 1876. However, it has not emerged as a separate institution before 1971. Today (2017) it is the largest University of Applied Sciences in the State of Hesse with about 16,000 students offering courses in architecture, chemical engineering, materials science, civil engineering, computer science, design, economics, electrical engineering and information technology, mathematics and science, mechanical engineering, media (including information science and engineering), plastics engineering, social and cultural studies, and several social sciences.

EHD Darmstadt
The Protestant University of Applied Sciences Darmstadt (EHD) is an officially recognised and Church-sponsored University. The sponsors are the Protestant Church in Hesse and Nassau, the Protestant Church of Kurhesse-Waldeck and the social welfare organisation of both Hessian Protestant Churches, the Diakonie Hesse. The EHD has approximately 1,700 students, 40 professors and 10 scientific employees and about 100 visiting lecturers every semester.

Sport
The city's main professional club is the football club SV Darmstadt 98, who play at the Merck-Stadion am Böllenfalltor.

Other, amateur football clubs are 1. FCA Darmstadt and Rot-Weiß Darmstadt.

Darmstadt Diamonds is the city's american football team.

Institutions

Technology

Darmstadt is home to many research institutions such as the Fraunhofer Society (Fraunhofer IGD, Fraunhofer LBF, Fraunhofer SIT) and the Gesellschaft für Schwerionenforschung (GSI, "Society for heavy ion Research"), which operates a particle accelerator in northern Darmstadt. The GSI, amongst other elements, discovered the chemical element darmstadtium (atomic number: 110), named after the city in 2003. This makes Darmstadt one of several cities with elements named after them.  Various other elements, including meitnerium (atomic number: 109) (1982), hassium (atomic number: 108) (1984), roentgenium (atomic number: 111) (1994) and copernicium (atomic number: 112) (1996) were also synthesized in the Darmstadt facility.

The European Space Operations Centre (ESOC) of the European Space Agency is located in Darmstadt. From here, various deep-space exploration spacecraft and Earth-orbiting satellites are operated for the purposes of scientific research, and technology development and demonstration.

EUMETSAT, the European Organisation for the Exploitation of Meteorological Satellites, operates the principal European meteorological satellites from its headquarters, including the first and second generations of Meteosat geostationary satellites, and the polar-orbiting Metop series.

Darmstadt is a centre for the pharmaceutical and chemical industry, with Merck, Röhm and Schenck RoTec (part of The Dürr Group) having their main plants and centres here.

Darmstadt is also a centre for the IT and telecommunications industry, with companies like Software AG, T-Systems (laboratories in Darmstadt) and Deutsche Telekom (laboratories in Darmstadt).

ATHENE, formerly Center for Research in Security and Privacy (CRISP), is the national research center for IT security and privacy in Germany and the largest research center for IT security in Europe. The research center is located in Darmstadt and deals with key issues of IT security in the digitization of government, business and society.

The German Research Center for Artificial Intelligence has a laboratory in Darmstadt.

The Hessian Centre for Artificial Intelligence (hessian.AI) has its headquarters in Darmstadt.

United States military presence
U.S. forces entered the city of Darmstadt on 25 March 1945. At the end of World War II, Darmstadt was among the 112 communities where U.S. forces were stationed. Early units stationed here included elements of the U.S. Constabulary, Air Force units and a Quartermaster School.

Over the years, the U.S. military community Darmstadt – under a variety of designations such as the 440th Signal Battalion, served as home for thousands of American soldiers and their families. It included six principal installations in Darmstadt and nearby Babenhausen, Griesheim and Münster, plus several housing areas, an airfield and a large number of smaller facilities as far away as Bensheim and Aschaffenburg. The military newspaper European Stars and Stripes also had its headquarters there. As of 1993, the Darmstadt military community also assumed responsibility for the remaining U.S. Army facilities in the Frankfurt area.

As part of the U.S. Army's ongoing transformation in Germany, the Darmstadt military community, by then designated U.S. Army Garrison Darmstadt, inactivated on 30 September 2008. Even after the garrison inactivation, however, there is still one unit active in Darmstadt: The 66th Military Intelligence Group at the Dagger Complex on Eberstädter Weg. It draws its support from the nearby U.S. Army Garrison Wiesbaden. The U.S. Army Garrison Wiesbaden's website mentions the unit still being active in Darmstadt, and a Marine Corps company being stationed there as well. With the exception of Dagger Complex, all remaining US installations are now empty and closed to the public, pending property disposal by the German authorities.

Tourist sights in Darmstadt

City 
 Mathildenhöhe with the Art Nouveau Museum
 Wedding Tower (Hochzeitsturm) at Sabaisplatz
 The former private chapel of the last Tsar of Russia
 State Theatre and Opera House
 Waldspirale Hundertwasser Building
 City Center with Luisenplatz, the Residential Palace and the Market Square
 Hauptbahnhof (Central Train Station) in Art Nouveau style
 Parks
 Herrngarten Park 
 Botanical Garden (Botanischer Garten)
 Vortex Garden
 Park Rosenhöhe (Rose Heights Park) with the Dukal Cemetery
 Porcelain Museum at Schlossgartenplatz
 St. Ludwig Church 
 Hessisches Landesmuseum
 Haus der Geschichte (House of History, former )
 Train Museum Kranichstein

Region 
 Odenwald 
 Bergstrasse
 Vineyards at Zwingenberg
 Frankenstein Castle 
 Messel Pit Fossil Site
 Melibokus

Notable people
 Christoph Graupner (1683–1760), composer and Hofkapellmeister (chapel master) at the court of Hesse-Darmstadt from 1711 to 1754
 Johann Jacob Dillenius (1684–1747), botanist
 Justus Freiherr von Liebig (1803–1873), chemist who made major contributions to agricultural and biological chemistry, and was considered the founder of organic chemistry
 Friedrich von Flotow (1812–1883), opera composer, died in Darmstadt.
 Georg Büchner (1813–1837), dramatist, poet and revolutionist
 Carl Amand Mangold (1813–1889), composer and conductor
 Friedrich August Kekulé (1829–1896), prominent organic chemist and the principal founder of the theory of chemical structure
 Eugen Bracht (1842–1921), landscape painter
 Georg von Hertling (1843–1919), politician
 Benjamin Altheimer (1850–1938), American banker and philanthropist
 Karl Muck (1859–1940), conductor
 Ernest Louis, Grand Duke of Hesse (1868–1937), last Grand Duke of Hesse and by Rhine
 Karl Wolfskehl (1869–1948), poet, editor and translator
 Alexandra Feodorovna (1872–1918), Russian Empress, born as Alix of Hesse, married Tsar Nicholas II of Russia
 Christian Stock (1884–1967), politician
 Anton Köllisch (1888–1916), chemist who first synthesized MDMA (known as "ecstasy")
 Beno Gutenberg (1889–1960), German-American seismologist
 Karl Plagge (1897–1957), Wehrmacht officer, saved Lithuanian Jews from extermination during The Holocaust, Righteous among the Nations
 Karl-Otto Koch (1897–1945), commandant of the Nazi concentration camps at Buchenwald and Sachsenhausen
 Josef Ganz (1898–1967), automotive engineer and pioneer, studied at the Technical University of Darmstadt
 Heinrich von Brentano (1904–1964), Federal Minister for Foreign Affairs from 1955 to 1961
 Hans Möser (1906–1948), Nazi SS concentration camp officer executed for war crimes
 Walter Schmiele (1909–1998), author and translator
 Arno Schmidt (1914–1979), author and translator
 Hans Stark (1921–1991), head of the admissions detail at Auschwitz-II Birkenau of Auschwitz concentration camp
 Georg Stern (1921–1980), operatic singer
 Karlheinz Stockhausen (1928–2007), leading 20th-century electronic composer
 Günter Strack (1929–1999), actor
 Maciej Łukaszczyk (1934–2014), Polish pianist at the Staatstheater Darmstadt, founder and president of the Chopin organisation, porter of the Polish and German order
 Helmut Markwort (born 1936), journalist
 Annegret Soltau (born 1946), artist
 Cord Meijering (born 1955), Dutch composer
 Christoph Lanz (born 1959), journalist
 Volker Weidermann (born 1969), writer and journalist
Florika Fink-Hooijer (born 1962), prominent European civil servant
 Markus Rühl (born 1972), bodybuilder
 Karola Obermüller (born 1977), composer
 Björn Bürger (born 1985), operatic baritone
 Andrea Petkovic (born 1987), tennis player
 Nina Gerhard (born 1974), singer
Zinaida Petrovna Ziberova (born 1909), composer

Twin towns – sister cities

Darmstadt is twinned with:

 Alkmaar, Netherlands (1958)
 Brescia, Italy (1991)
 Bursa, Turkey (1971)
 Chesterfield, England, UK (1959)
 Freiberg, Germany (1990)
 Graz, Austria (1968)
 Gstaad (Saanen), Switzerland (1991)
 Gyönk, Hungary (1990)
 Liepāja, Latvia (1993)
 Logroño, Spain (2002)
 Płock, Poland (1988)
 San Antonio, United States (2017)
 Szeged, Hungary (1990)
 Trondheim, Norway (1968)
 Troyes, France (1958)
 Uzhhorod, Ukraine (1992)

See also 
 Darmstadt University of Applied Sciences
 Technical University of Darmstadt
 Rhein-Main-Area

References

External links

  
 Discover Darmstadt – City Tourist Website 
 Germany Travel – Darmstadt 
 

 
Capitals of former nations
Grand Duchy of Hesse
Merck Group
Odenwald
Holocaust locations in Germany